Raavu Balasaraswathi Devi (born 28 August 1928) is an Indian singer and actress who performed from 1930 to the 1960s in Telugu and Tamil cinema. She was the first light music singer on All India Radio and the first playback singer in the Telugu cinema.

Early life
Balasaraswathi was born in Venkatagiri in 1928. She learned music from Allathuru Subbayya and lent her voice for the first solo gramophone by HMV recording company at the age of six.

Career
She acted as child actor Ganga and also sang in the films Sati Anasuya and Bhakta Dhruva, both directed by C. Pullaiah in 1936. Observing her talent, director K. Subramaniam invited her to act in Tamil films. In the following years, she acted in Tamil films like Bhaktha Kuchela (1936), Balayogini (1937), and Thiruneelakantar (1939). She played the role of Tukaram's daughter in Tukaram (1938). The Tukaram role was portrayed by Musiri Subramania Iyer in the Tamil version and by C. S. R. Anjaneyulu in the Telugu version. In 1940, she acted with S. Rajeswara Rao in Illalu, directed by Gudavalli Ramabrahmam.

In Bhagya Lakshmi (1943) of Sri Renuka Films of V. Nagayya, she sang for Kamala Kotnis on screen, this being the first instance of playback singing in Telugu cinema. The song Thinne Meedha Sinnoda was composed by Bhimavarapu Narasimha Rao.

She lived for some years in Mysore, and then shifted to Hyderabad. After her husband's death, she has lived with her son in her grandson's house in Secunderabad.

Music composers she sang for
She worked with G. Ramanathan, K. V. Mahadevan, C. R. Subburaman, S. V. Venkatraman, Viswanathan–Ramamoorthy, Bhimavarapu Narasimha Rao, R. Chinnaiah, S. Hanumantha Rao, S. Rajeswara Rao, P. Adinarayana Rao, G. Aswathama, Ogirala Ramachandra Rao, Balantrapu Rajanikanta Rao, Adepalli Rama Rao, C. N. Pandurangan, V. Nagayya, T. V. Raju, Ghantasala, Naushad, L. Malleswara Rao, S. Dakshinamurthi, Vedha, M. Ranga Rao, Master Venu, R. Sudarsanam, Pamarti Krishna Murty, G. Govindarajulu Naidu and M. B. Sreenivasan.

With playback singers
She sang duets mostly with Ghantasala and A. M. Rajah. She sang with T. M. Soundararajan, T. A. Mothi, Seerkazhi Govindarajan, S. Rajam, M. S. Ramarao, Pithapuram Nageswara Rao and Subramanyam. 

She also sang duets with Jikki, A. P. Komala, M. S. Rajeswari, K. Rani, P. Susheela and P. S. Vaideghi.

Filmography

Playback singer

Actress

 Sati Anasuya (1936) Telugu
 Bhakta Dhruva (1936) Telugu
 Bhaktha Kuchela (1936) Tamil
 Balayogini (1936) Tamil
 Tukaram (1938) Telugu & Tamil
 Thiruneelakantar (1939) Tamil
 Illalu (1940) Telugu
 Apavadu (1941) Telugu
 Chandrahasa (1941) Telugu
 Dhaasippen (1943) Tamil
 Radhika (1947) Telugu
 Bilhana (1948) Telugu & Tamil
 Shanthi Nivasam (1960) Telugu
 Sabhash Raja (1961) Telugu

References

External links
 
 Listen to some of the songs of R. Balasaraswathi at Old Telugu Songs.com

1928 births
Telugu playback singers
Living people
Indian film actresses
20th-century Indian actresses
Indian women playback singers
20th-century Indian singers
Actresses in Telugu cinema
Actresses in Tamil cinema
Singers from Andhra Pradesh
Actresses from Andhra Pradesh
Film musicians from Andhra Pradesh
People from Nellore district
All India Radio people
All India Radio women
20th-century Indian women singers
Women musicians from Andhra Pradesh